Norton-sub-Hamdon is a village and civil parish in the South Somerset district of the English county of Somerset, situated five miles west of Yeovil. The village has a population of 743.

History

The majority of the houses and cottages in the village are made from the local stone, hamstone, which is taken from the nearby Ham Hill, from which the village gets its name: Norton sub Hamdon means "north farm below the hill farm".

After the Norman Conquest the manor was granted to Robert, Count of Mortain, who gave it to Grestein Abbey in Normandy, which administered it through Wilmington Priory in Sussex until it was confiscated by the crown in the 14th century. It was then given to the De la Pole family and inherited with the dukedom of Suffolk by the Seymours and in 1671 by the Earl of Aylesbury, before being broken up and sold off.

The parish was part of the hundred of Houndsborough.

Governance

There is a parish council.

The village falls within the Non-metropolitan district of South Somerset, which was formed on 1 April 1974 under the Local Government Act 1972. It has previously been part of Yeovil Rural District, and the county of Somerset.

It is also part of the Yeovil county constituency represented in the House of Commons of the Parliament of the United Kingdom. The constituency elects one Member of Parliament (MP) by the first past the post system of election.

Localities

Little Norton

Little Norton is a more or less contiguous hamlet to the east that includes the western fringe of Ham Hill an ancient hillfort (and scheduled Ancient Monument and extends also to its southeast to High Wood and Bagnel Farm which is listed building.

Landmarks
Homefield in Rectory Lane was previously known as Folly's. It dates from the 17th century and has been designated as a Grade II* listed building.

The manor house was built in the 17th century and is now in multiple occupation.

The village pub, the Lord Nelson Inn, also has 17th-century origins.

Education

The original primary school dates from the mid 18th century. It is situated next to the churchyard and its dovecote. A new school beside the Recreation Field was opened in 1997.

Religious sites

Church of St Mary the Virgin in Norton sub Hamdon has 13th century origins, but was largely rebuilt between 1500 and 1510. Further restoration was undertaken by Henry Wilson in 1894 and 1904. The five-stage tower, which rises  was damaged by lightning and fire on 29 July 1894, but restored within a year, preserving the original design. It has a double plinth, offset corner buttresses, dividing strings, battlemented parapet with pairs of corner pinnacles extended from buttresses, and central paired pinnacles corbelled off gargoyles. The dovecote in the churchyard dates from the 17th century, and was associated with a manor house which was demolished around 1850.

Notable residents

 John James Henry Sturmey (1857–1930), known as Henry Sturmey, is best remembered as the inventor with James Archer of the Sturmey-Archer three-speed hub for bicycles, but he was a technical editor and journalist heavily involved as a pioneer of the cycling and automotive industries. Born at Norton-sub-Hamdon, Somerset, he died aged 72 at his home in Coventry on 8 January.
 Samuel Lawrence (16 August 1879 – 25 October 1959) was a Canadian politician and trade unionist. He was born in the Somerset village of Norton-sub-Hamdon to William Lawrence and Ann Geard on 16 August 1879, he emigrated to Canada, settling in Hamilton, Ontario with his family in 1912. In 1934 he was elected to the Legislative Assembly of Ontario as the Member of the Legislative Assembly (MLA) for Hamilton East.
 The village was home to Paddy Ashdown, former local MP and ex-leader of the Liberal Democrats. He was knighted in 2000 and became a life peer as Lord Ashdown of Norton-sub-Hamdon in the County of Somerset in the House of Lords after retiring from the Commons in 2001. He is buried on the north side of the churchyard.

References

External links
Village website

Villages in South Somerset
Civil parishes in Somerset